The Endless Summer II is a 1994 film directed by Bruce Brown and is a sequel to his 1966 film The Endless Summer. In The Endless Summer II, surfers Pat O'Connell and Robert "Wingnut" Weaver retrace the steps of Mike Hynson and Robert August. It shows the growth and evolution of the surfing scene since the first film, which presented only classic longboard surfing. O'Connell rides a shortboard, which was developed in the time between the two movies, and there are scenes of windsurfing and bodyboarding.

The film illustrates how far surfing had spread, with footage of surf sessions in France, South Africa, Costa Rica, Australia, Bali, Java, and even Alaska. It also has a brief cameo appearance by morey surfer Felipe Zylbersztajn, Steve Irwin, and Mary, a crocodile from Irwin's Australia Zoo.

In 2003, Dana Brown, Bruce's son, made what is seen as the "third movie", Step into Liquid. It follows the evolution of surfing over the last 10–15 years from shortboarding to tow-in surfing.

Year-end lists 
 8th – David Stupich, The Milwaukee Journal

References

External links
Bruce Brown Films
 
 
 

1994 films
American sequel films
Australian surfing films
Documentary films about surfing
Films directed by Bruce Brown
Films shot in Indonesia
Beach party films
1990s English-language films